The Case Study 01: Tour is the second headlining concert tour by Canadian recording artist Daniel Caesar. The tour is in support of his album, Case Study 01 (2019).

Opening acts
Koffee 
August Wahh 
CRWN

Setlist
The following setlist was obtained from the concert held on July 23, 2019, at the New Frontier Theater in Quezon City in the Philippines. It does not represent all concerts for the duration of the tour. 
"Cyanide"
"Love Again"
"Restore the Feeling"
"Open Up"
"Violet"
"Complexities"
"Hold Me Down"
"Too Deep to Turn Back"
"Frontal Lobe Muzik"
"Get You"
"Best Part"
"Blessed"
"Entropy"
Encore
"Japanese Denim"
"Superposition"

Tour dates

Festivals and other miscellaneous performances
This concert was a part of "We the Fest"
This concert was a part of the "Good Vibes Festival"
This concert was a part of the "Fuji Rock Festival"
This concert was a part of the "Lights On Festival"
This concert was a part of the "Camp Flog Gnaw"

Cancellations and rescheduled shows

References

2019 concert tours